The Australian Family Physician is a monthly peer-reviewed medical journal published by the Royal Australian College of General Practitioners. It was established in 1956 as the Annals of General Practice, obtaining its current name in 1971. The journal is abstracted and indexed in Index Medicus/MEDLINE/PubMed and the Science Citation Index Expanded. According to the Journal Citation Reports, the journal has a 2015 impact factor of 0.759.

References

External links 

Australian Family Physician
Monthly journals
English-language journals
Publications established in 1956